Romeo is a Statutory Town in Conejos County, Colorado, United States. The population was 404 at the 2010 census.

A post office called Romeo was established in 1901. The community derives its name from the surname Romero.

Geography
Romeo is located in east-central Conejos County at  (37.172602, -105.984680), in the San Luis Valley region. U.S. Route 285 runs along the western border of the town, leading north  to Alamosa and south  to the New Mexico border and beyond.

Demographics

As of the census of 2000, there were 375 people, 117 households, and 93 families residing in the town. The racial makeup of the town was 58.93% White, 0.27% African American, 0.53% Native American, 0.53% Asian, 32.80% from other races, and 6.93% from two or more races. Hispanic or Latino of any race were 77.07% of the population.

There were 117 households, out of which 50.4% had children under the age of 18 living with them, 61.5% were married couples living together, 15.4% had a female householder with no husband present, and 19.7% were non-families. 16.2% of all households were made up of individuals, and 5.1% had someone living alone who was 65 years of age or older.  The average household size was 3.21 and the average family size was 3.63.

In the town, the population was spread out, with 37.6% under the age of 18, 6.7% from 18 to 24, 28.0% from 25 to 44, 18.7% from 45 to 64, and 9.1% who were 65 years of age or older.  The median age was 30 years. For every 100 females, there were 93.3 males.  For every 100 females age 18 and over, there were 87.2 males.

The median income for a household in the town was $19,306, and the median income for a family was $21,806. Males had a median income of $23,438 versus $21,563 for females. The per capita income for the town was $10,175.  About 30.5% of families and 34.3% of the population were below the poverty line, including 39.2% of those under age 18 and 29.4% of those age 65 or over.

See also

San Luis Valley

References

External links
Town of Romeo contacts
CDOT map of the Town of Romeo

Towns in Conejos County, Colorado
Towns in Colorado